The Priory of Our Lady of Graces, known locally as the North Abbey, was a 13th-century Irish Dominican monastery situated north of Youghal, County Cork.

History 
The priory was founded in 1268 by Thomas FitzMaurice FitzGerald, the second baron of Desmond, whose maternal grandfather,   Maurice FitzGerald, 2nd Lord of Offaly, had founded the Franciscan Friary of South Abbey, Youghal.

The Dominican priory was initially dedicated to the Holy Cross, but was changed to 'Our Lady of Graces' in the late 15th century following the re-discovery of a small, ivory statue of the Madonna and Child.

Samuel Lewis in his Topographical Dictionary of Ireland, written in 1837, said of it: "Thomas, whose son, in 1263 or 1271, founded a Dominican monastery, called the Priory of St. Mary of Graces."

This statue had made Youghal the centre of Marian devotion for several centuries, but ended after the priory was dissolved under King Henry VIII in the 16th century.  The statue can now be found in St Mary's Dominican Priory in Cork City.

Lewis goes on to say in his book that:  The western gable and some of the eastern portions of the Dominican friary, at the north end of the town, still remain
...
Near the south end of the town is a chapel of ease, a neat plain building, erected in 1817 on the cemetery of the ancient Dominican friary, at an expense of £1200, of which £900 was a gift from the late Board of First Fruits and £300 was raised by subscription

Today 

Some ruins of the priory can still be seen, and the area is also home to the main cemetery of Youghal.

Burials
Thomas FitzGerald, 2nd Baron Desmond
John FitzGerald, 4th Earl of Desmond
James FitzGerald, 6th Earl of Desmond
James FitzGerald, 8th Earl of Desmond
Thomas FitzGerald, 11th Earl of Desmond

References

External sources 
 Samuel Lewis, Topographical Dictionary of Ireland, 1837.

See also
 List of abbeys and priories in Ireland (County Cork)
 Youghal
 Youghal Priory
 South Abbey, Youghal
 Molana Abbey
 Rincrew Abbey

Youghal
Religion in Youghal
Buildings and structures in Youghal
Youghal
Youghal
Youghal
Youghal